Blagdon Hall is a privately owned English country house near Cramlington in Northumberland. It is a Grade I listed building. The house and estate have been in the ownership of the White Ridley family since 1698. The present Viscount Ridley is the science writer and hereditary peer Matt Ridley.

The house was built in two phases between about 1720 and 1752 by Matthew White and his son Sir Matthew White, 1st Baronet, whose sister Elizabeth married Matthew Ridley (1711–1778), four times Mayor of Newcastle upon Tyne. His son Matthew White Ridley inherited the estate and succeeded his uncle as second baronet. Blagdon Hall was substantially enlarged in the nineteenth century to designs by the architects John Dobson and Ignatius Bonomi. Some of these additions were removed following a fire in 1944.

The gardens were extensively remodelled in the 1930s by Sir Edwin Lutyens, whose daughter Ursula was married to The 3rd Viscount Ridley.

The stable block designed by James Wyatt in Palladian style in 1791 is Grade II* listed and a 19th-century folly in the grounds is Grade II listed.  The gardens also contain the only surviving bronze of John Graham Lough's gigantic statue of Milo of Croton.

On the estate is Shotton Surface Mine, a large open cast coal mine and Northumberlandia (the "Lady of the North"), a huge land sculpture in the shape of a reclining female figure made from mining waste. The Royal Agricultural Society of England awarded the Bledisloe Gold Medal in 2015 to Ridley as they "wanted to highlight the extensive environmental improvement work that has been undertaken across the land".

References

   Keys to the Past

External links

Grade I listed buildings in Northumberland
Grade I listed houses
Country houses in Northumberland
Gardens in Northumberland
Works of Edwin Lutyens in England
Ridley family